The Henry Gane House is a historic house at 121 Adena Road in Newton, Massachusetts. Built c. 1860s, the two-plus story wood-frame house is distinguished as one of Newton's finest Second Empire houses. Its eaves are lined with dentil moulding and paired brackets, its windows have elaborate hoods, and its porch, which wraps around two sides of the house, has elaborate woodwork detail. The land was subdivided in 1897, after which adjacent Northgate Park was developed; the house was moved to its present location after World War I.

The house was listed on the National Register of Historic Places in 1986.

See also
 National Register of Historic Places listings in Newton, Massachusetts

References

Houses on the National Register of Historic Places in Newton, Massachusetts
Second Empire architecture in Massachusetts
Houses completed in 1865